Music player can refer to:

 Various types of musicians: bass player, guitar player, piano player, etc.
 Music box
 Player piano
 Record player
 Tape player
 Media player software, software running on a computer that can play various types of media, including audio
 Portable media player, hardware device for playing back music